Terres Neuves tram stop is a tram stop on line C of the Tramway de Bordeaux. It is located near Boulevard Jean-Jacques Bosc in the commune of Bègles. The stop is operated by Transports Bordeaux Métropole.

For most of the day on Mondays to Fridays, trams run at least every five minutes in both directions. Services run less frequently in the early morning, late evenings, weekends and public holidays.

Interchanges

 Buses of the TBC:

References

Bordeaux tramway stops
Railway stations in France opened in 2008
Tram stops in Bègles